Badger Creek is a stream in Faribault and Martin counties, in the U.S. state of Minnesota. It is a tributary of the Blue Earth River.

Badger Creek was named for the badgers once hunted in the area for their fur.

See also
List of rivers of Minnesota

References

Rivers of Faribault County, Minnesota
Rivers of Martin County, Minnesota
Rivers of Minnesota